The Antillean scallop, Bractechlamys antillarum, is a species of bivalve mollusc in the family Pectinidae. It can be found in Caribbean waters, ranging from southern Florida to the West Indies and Bermuda.

References

Pectinidae
Bivalves described in 1853